Rafael Batista Hernández (born 24 October 1936), also known as Felo, is a Spanish former professional footballer who played as a midfielder.

Born in Las Palmas, Canary Islands, he played for UD Las Palmas, Real Madrid and Sevilla. He scored Real's only goal at 1964 European Cup Final.

Club career

Source:

References

External links
 
 "Játékos profil: Felo, Rafael Batista Hernández" 

Spanish footballers
Real Madrid CF players
Sevilla FC players
UD Las Palmas players
La Liga players
1936 births
Living people
Association football midfielders